The Pro-Design Jazz is an Austrian single-place paraglider that was designed and produced by Pro-Design of Natters, introduced in 2003. It is now out of production.

Design and development
The aircraft was designed as an intermediate glider.

The models are each named for their relative size.

Variants
Jazz S
Small-sized model for lighter pilots. The glider model is DHV 1-2 certified.
Jazz M
Mid-sized model for medium-weight pilots. The glider model is DHV 1-2 certified.
Jazz L
Large-sized model for heavier pilots. The glider model is DHV 1-2 certified.
Jazz XL
Extra large-sized model for heavier pilots. The glider model is DHV 1-2 certified.

Specifications (Jazz M)

References

Jazz
Paragliders
2000s Austrian aircraft